Vitaliy Nedilko (born 21 August 1982 in Sakhnovshchyna, Sakhnovshchyna Raion, Kharkiv Oblast, Ukrainian SSR) is a professional Ukrainian football goalkeeper who plays for Volyn Lutsk in the Ukrainian First League.

Career
He made his debut for Volyn Lutsk in the Ukrainian Premier League in a match against FC Metalurh Zaporizhia on 24 May 2003.

References

External links 
 
 

1982 births
Living people
Ukrainian footballers
FC Volyn Lutsk players
FC Ikva Mlyniv players
SC Tavriya Simferopol players
Association football goalkeepers
Ukrainian Premier League players
Ukrainian First League players
Ukrainian Second League players
Sportspeople from Kharkiv Oblast